Ende may refer to

Places
Ende Regency, a regency (second level subdivision) of Indonesia
Ende, East Nusa Tenggara, the seat (capital) of Ende Regency

People
Ende (artist), 10th-century Spanish manuscript illuminator
Erik Ende, a leader of Scouting in Sweden
Edgar Ende (1901–1965), German surrealist painter
Hans am Ende (1864–1918), German Impressionist painter
Harald Ende (born 1929), German musician
Hermann Ende (1829–1907), German architect
Joop van den Ende (born 1942), Dutch media tycoon and theatrical producer
Karl Friedrich am Ende (1756-1810), Austrian general in the War of the Fourth Coalition
Michael Ende (1929–1995), German fantasy writer, son of Edgar Ende
Tan Ende (born 1971), Chinese footballer and coach

Other uses
Ende: A Diary Of The Third World War, a post-apocalyptic novel by Anton-Andreas Guha
Ende language (Indonesia) of Flores Island, Indonesia
Ende language, a variety of the Agob language of Papua New Guinea
Ende or H. Hasan Aroeboesman Airport, Flores Island, Indonesia

See also
Van der Ende, a Dutch surname